Charles Lewinsky (14 April 1946) is a Swiss screenwriter and playwright (among others Fascht e Familie), as well as a writer of novels and non-fiction, born and living in Zürich.

Early life and education 
Born and raised in Zürich, Canton of Zürich in Switzerland, Charles Lewinsky studied German and theater science in Berlin and Zurich, and worked as an assistant director of Fritz Kortner. In 1965/67 he was assistant director and dramaturg at the Stadttheater Luzern, in 1967/70 dramaturge and personal assistant to the director at the Stadttheater Ingolstadt, in 1970/71 dramaturge at the Freie Volksbühne Berlin, and in 1972/75 dramaturg and director at the Staatstheater Kassel. Charles Lewinsky is married with Ruth Lewinsky née Halpern, a Swiss writer who also was born in Zürich.

Dramaturgy and playwright 
In 1975 Lewinsky became the editor and head of the "word - entertainment" department of the present Swiss national television SRF. Since 1980 he has worked as a freelance writer, especially for television. Lewinsky claims to have written about 1,000 television shows for broadcasters in Austria, Germany and Switzerland, about 30 radioplays and the lyrics for about 500 songs.

For SRF Charles Lewinsky wrote the successful Swiss German language sitcom Fascht e Familie that premiered between 1994 and 1999 on the Swiss national television channel SRF 1, starring among others Trudi Roth, Walter Andreas Müller, Martin Schenkel, Hanna Scheuring, Andreas Matti and Sandra Moser. First aired on 4 November 1994, Fascht e Familie is still very popular in the Swiss German culture, and from time to time re-broadcast in the Swiss German television. In 1997 the RTL-Group in Germany asked for an adoption for the German television, and so the dialogues were synchronized in the Swiss Standard German language, but the Swiss German oriented humour did not fit the audience's gusto in Germany, and even in Austria, and so just 40 episodes have been broadcast between January and October 1997 as Fast ’ne Familie on Super RTL.

For the stage Lewinsky dramatized among others Erich Kästner's Drei Männer im Schnee that premiered end of September 1983 in his Swiss German adaption, and then toured with the Theater Dreiländereck Basel with Ruedi Walter, Inigo Gallo and Dieter Ballmann, directed by Gallo. Lewinsky wrote cabaret revues (together with Hans Gmür) and further comedies for theater stages in Switzerland and Germany. Moreover, Lewinsky wrote since 1989 more than thirty plays, including "Guillotin" whose stage version premiered under the title "Der gute Doktor Guillotin" at Theater am Neumarkt in Zürich on 15 April 1992. Among others, he also wrote adaptions of plays for the Bernhard-Theater Zürich.

Writing 
His literal career started in 1984, when Lewinsky and Doris Morf published the political fiction "Hitler auf dem Rütli", which was followed by about 20 books to this day, normally novels or crime stories, among them Gerron (2011) about Kurt Gerron, a German actor and director who was deported by the Nazi regime to KZ Theresienstadt, and even there was forced by the Nazis to produce a propaganda film. Kastelau, Lewinsky's 2014 novel, is the story of the survivors of an exalted Nazi UFA film crew that survives in Bavaria in southern Germany the last months of World War II.

On occasion of the 75th anniversary of the library of the Israelitische Cultusgemeinde Zürich (ICZ), the anniversary edition Quelle lebender Bücher (literally: source of living books) was published, edited by the ICZ-librarians Yvonne Domhardt and Kerstin Paul, in which 75 people present their favorite book from the library. Lewinsky was inspired by a 1938 edition of the Israelisches Wochenblatt newspaper about a variety artists searching his suitcase and tailcoat; the nameless man became the protagonist Felix Grün in Lewinsky's family saga Melnitz.

On 14 April 2016 Lewinskiy presented his new novel on occasion of his 70th birthday at the Theater Rigiblick in Zürich. Andersen focuses among others the question what would happen if reincarnation would be associated with the memory of the past life. How would that the protagonist's – once a bad man - life impact? But I write not a scientific or philosophical book, I tell a story, said the author in an interview.

Awards 
 2014: German Book Prize, nomination for Kastelau.
 2011: Swiss Book Prize for Gerron.
 2002: Award by the Swiss magazine Tele for his work as author of sitcoms.
 1995: Prix Walo ’94 for his work since 1974.
 1995: Sparten-PRIX WALO for Radio/TV/Filmproduktion (Fascht e Familie).
 1983: Chaplin award of the city of Montreux.

Works

Publications (selected works) 
 Andersen: Roman. Nagel & Kimche Verlag, München 2016. .
 Kastelau. Nagel & Kimche im Carl Hanser Verlag, München 2014. .
 Falscher Mao, echter Goethe. 48 Glossen über Bücher und Büchermacher. NZZ Libro, Zürich 2012, .
 Gerron. Nagel & Kimche, Zürich 2011, .
 Mattscheibe. Talkshow. Haffmans bei Zweitausendeins, Frankfurt am Main 2008, .
 Einmal Erde und zurück. Der Besuch des alten Kindes. Atlantis, Zürich 2007; dtv, München 2009, .
 Melnitz. Nagel & Kimche, Zürich 2006, . In English, translated by Shaun Whiteside: Melnitz. Atlantic Books, London 2015, .
 Ein ganz gewöhnlicher Jude. Rotbuch, Hamburg 2005; Rotbuch, Berlin 2007, .
 Johannistag. Haffmans, Zürich 2000; dtv, München 2009, .
 Der A-Quotient. Theorie und Praxis des Lebens mit Arschlöchern. Haffmans, Zürich 1994; Haffmans bei Zweitausendeins, Frankfurt am Main 2011, .

Plays (selected works) 
 2011: Gotthelf – Das Musical
 2010: Ein Heimspiel
 2009: Ein ganz gewöhnlicher Jude
 2009: Tie Break
 2006: Heimat, Sweet Heimat
 2004: Abdankung (with Patrick Frey)
 2003: Fremdi Fötzel
 2002: Deep (musical, music by Markus Schönholzer)
 2002: Welt im Spiegel (texts by Robert Gernhardt)
 2001: Freunde, das Leben ist lebenswert
 2000: Ganz e feini Familie
 1992: Der gute Doktor Guillotin
 1985: Potztuusig! Zweituusig! Cabaret-Revue with Hans Gmür
 1984: Drei Männer im Schnee (by Erich Kästner)
 1983: Plausch in Züri

Filmography (selected works) 
 2005:  
 2005: Das geheime Leben meiner Freundin (Television film) 
 1995–2002: Das Traumschiff (Television series, 5 episodes) 
 2002: Die fabelhaften Schwestern (Television film) 
 2000: Fertig lustig (Television series)
 1994–1998: Fascht e Familie (Television series, 100 episodes) 
 1992: Verflixte Leidenschaft (Television film) 
 1985: Der Mann am Klavier (Television film)

References

External links 
  
 
 Charles Lewinsky on the website of the Swiss national television SRF 
 Charles Lewinsky - The Story of the Storyteller

1946 births
Living people
Male dramatists and playwrights
Swiss screenwriters
Male screenwriters
20th-century dramatists and playwrights
Writers from Zürich
Swiss Jews
Jewish dramatists and playwrights
20th-century Swiss novelists
Swiss male novelists
21st-century dramatists and playwrights
21st-century Swiss novelists
20th-century male writers
21st-century male writers
Film people from Zürich